TalkBank is a multilingual corpus established in 2002 and currently directed and maintained by Brian MacWhinney.  The goal of TalkBank is to foster fundamental research in the study of human and animal communication. It contains sample databases from within several subfields of communication, including first language acquisition, second language acquisition, conversation analysis, classroom discourse, and aphasic language. It uses these databases to advance the development of standards and tools for creating, sharing, searching, and commenting upon primary linguistic materials via networked computers.

TalkBank contains CHILDES (Child Language Data Exchange System), a corpus of first language acquisition data. It also hosts the CLAN (Computerized Language ANalysis) software used to transcribe, handle and play media, in the CHAT format.

See also
 Transana, QDA Coding Program, originally funded development by the TalkBank

References

External links
TalkBank Homepage

Corpora